Antonius Hermanus Johannes Lovink (12 July 1902 – 27 March 1995) was a Dutch diplomat who served as the last High Commissioner of the Crown in the Dutch East Indies in 1949, the year the Dutch East Indies declared independence from the Netherlands, and renamed itself Indonesia. He later served as Dutch Ambassador to Australia and Canada, the latter which he lived in after he resigned in 1967.

References 

1902 births
1995 deaths
Governors-General of the Dutch East Indies
Diplomats from The Hague
Ambassadors of the Netherlands to Canada